The 1961 U.S. Women's Open was the 16th U.S. Women's Open, held June 29 to July 1 at the Lower Course of Baltusrol Golf Club in Springfield, New Jersey.

Mickey Wright, age 26, won the third of her four U.S. Women's Open titles, six strokes ahead of runner-up Betsy Rawls, a four-time winner and the defending champion. It was Wright's third win at the U.S. Women's Open in four years, and the sixth of her thirteen major titles.

After opening with a par 72 on Thursday to co-lead, Wright shot an 80 (+8) in the second round on Friday and dropped four shots back after 36 holes. A three-under 69 on Saturday morning regained the lead after 54 holes, two strokes ahead of Rawls.

The Lower Course has hosted the U.S. Open four times (two won by Jack Nicklaus) and a PGA Championship, won by Phil Mickelson. The U.S. Women's Open returned to Baltusrol in 1985, but was played on the Upper Course.

Past champions in the field

Source:

Final leaderboard
Saturday, July 1, 1961

Source:

References

External links
USGA final leaderboard
U.S. Women's Open Golf Championship
U.S. Women's Open – past champions – 1961
Baltusrol Golf Club

U.S. Women's Open
Golf in New Jersey
Sports competitions in New Jersey
U.S. Women's Open
U.S. Women's Open
U.S. Women's Open
U.S. Women's Open
Women's sports in New Jersey